Blennosperma bakeri is a rare species of flowering plant in the daisy family known by the common names Baker's stickyseed and Sonoma sunshine.

Distribution
It is endemic to Sonoma County, California, where it is known from a few remaining vernal pool sites on the wet grasslands of the Laguna de Santa Rosa and Sonoma Valley. It is a federally listed endangered species. It is found alongside other rare vernal pool plants including the Sebastopol meadowfoam, Limnanthes vinculans, and Burke's goldfields, Lasthenia burkei. Threats to its survival include the alteration of its habitat for development, road maintenance, grazing, and agriculture, as well as collecting, herbivory by thrips, and invasive plants.

Description
This is a small annual herb under 30 centimeters tall. The leaves are 5 to 15 centimeters long and linear in shape with lobes near the ends. The inflorescence bears a few flower heads. Each head contains a center of yellow disc florets, some of which bear prominent white stigmas and white pollen. Around the edge of the head is a fringe of yellow ray florets with red stigmas. The fruit is an achene a few millimeters long which becomes sticky when wet.

The plant is known from fifteen occurrences, but six of these may be degraded or destroyed. Several artificial vernal pools have been created to increase the numbers of the plant, but the United States Fish and Wildlife Service does not consider these an adequate replacement for natural pools.

See also
Milo Samuel Baker

References

External links
Jepson Manual Treatment
USDA Plants Profile

Senecioneae
Endemic flora of California
Natural history of Sonoma County, California
Sonoma Valley
Critically endangered flora of California
Endemic flora of the San Francisco Bay Area